Baker Presbyterian Church is a historic church in Gothic Revival located at 3015 Groom Road in Baker, Louisiana.

Built in 1905, the one-story clapboard church and the two-story crenelated bell tower are almost intact since the time of their construction.

The church was added to the National Register of Historic Places on March 1, 1990.

See also
National Register of Historic Places listings in East Baton Rouge Parish, Louisiana

References

Presbyterian churches in Louisiana
Churches on the National Register of Historic Places in Louisiana
Gothic Revival church buildings in Louisiana
Churches completed in 1905
Churches in East Baton Rouge Parish, Louisiana
National Register of Historic Places in East Baton Rouge Parish, Louisiana
1905 establishments in Louisiana